Plead Guilty is a 1983 Soviet drama film directed by Igor Voznesensky.

Plot 
The film tells about the criminal investigator Sergey Voronin, who is literally in love with his work. He organized a club of young friends of the police, in which they play sports and communicate, but he is worried about the guys who fell under the influence of high school student Nikolai Boyko, who is engaged in robbery. His mother is too busy with journalism to change her son. Teachers can't do anything about it either. And suddenly Nikolai wounded a girl with a knife.

Cast 
 Aleksandr Mikhailov as Voronin
 Vladimir Shevelkov as Nikolai Boiko
 Igor Rogachyov as Viktor Vladimirov
 Aleksandr Silin as Slava Goriaev
 Marina Yakovleva as Yulia Safonova
 Vera Sotnikova as Olga
 Irina Miroshnichenko as Viktoria Pavlovna, Kolya's Mother (as I.Miroshnichenko)
 Valentin Pechnikov as Saikin
 Vladimir Koretsky as Aleksandr Boiko
 Lyubov Sokolova as Vladimirov's grandmother (as L.Sokolova)

References

External links 
 

1983 films
1980s Russian-language films
Soviet drama films
1983 drama films
Soviet teen films